Quintus Mucius Scaevola Augur (c. 169 – 88 BC) was a politician of the Roman Republic and an early authority on Roman law. He was first educated in law by his father (whose name he shared) and in philosophy by the stoic Panaetius of Rhodes.

Scaevola was made tribune in 128 BC, aedile in 125, and praetor in 121, in which capacity he acted as governor of Asia. Upon his return to Rome the following year he faced a charge of extortion brought by Titus Albucius (probably on personal grounds) which he successfully defended. In 117, he was elected consul. 

In his old age, Scaevola vigorously maintained his interest in the law and in the affairs of Rome. He also passed on his knowledge of law to some of Rome's most celebrated orators, as the teacher of Cicero and Atticus. In 88 BC, he defended Gaius Marius against Sulla's motion to have him named an enemy of the people, saying that he would never agree to have this done to a man who had saved Rome.

Cicero used the persona of his old master as an interlocutor in three works, his De Oratore, De amicitia, and De republica. This usage places Scaevola as a member of the Scipionic Circle.

Family
Scaevola married Laelia, a daughter of Gaius Laelius, a close friend of Scipio Aemilianus, and had a son and two daughters. His wife, daughter, and granddaughters were all famed for the purity of their Latin.

Scaevola's daughter married Lucius Licinius Crassus, consul in 95 BC and the greatest orator of his day. 

His first cousins included the consuls and Pontifices maximi Publius Licinius Crassus Dives Mucianus and Publius Mucius Scaevola. The former was father of Licinia, wife of the ill-fated tribune Gaius Gracchus.

160s BC births
88 BC deaths
2nd-century BC Roman augurs
2nd-century BC Roman consuls
2nd-century BC Roman praetors
1st-century BC Roman augurs
Scaevola Augur, Quintus
Year of birth uncertain